This is a list of songs that topped the Belgian Walloon (francophone) Ultratop 40 in 1999.

See also
1999 in music

References

External links
 Ultratop 40

1999 in Belgium
1999 record charts
1999